A chamber choir is a small or medium-sized choir of roughly 8 to 40 singers (occasionally called 'chamber singers'), typically singing classical or religious music in a concert setting. (This is distinct from e.g. a church choir, which sings in religious services, or choirs specializing in popular music such as a barbershop chorus).

See also
 International Chamber Choir Competition Marktoberdorf, held every two years

References

Choirs